DJ Kane, also known as Capítulo I: Mía (English: Chapter I: Mine), is the debut studio album by Mexican-American recording artist DJ Kane. It was released on March 23, 2004 by EMI Latin. DJ Kane was nominated for a Lo Nuestro Award for Urban Album of the Year.

Track listing

References

2004 debut albums
DJ Kane albums
EMI Latin albums
Spanish-language albums
Tejano Music Award winners for Album of the Year